Richard Clitheroe or Clitherow may refer to:

Richard Clitheroe (died 1420), MP for Kent
Richard Clitheroe (died c. 1463), MP for New Romney
Richard Clitheroe, see Socialist Health Association
Richard Clitherow (1902–1947), MP
Richard Clitherow (bishop)